Roberta de Melo Moretti Avery (born 9 July 1985) is a Brazilian cricketer and the captain of the national women's cricket team.

Career

Early life and career 
Moretti was born in Poços de Caldas, Minas Gerais as part of a sporting family: her parents played golf. She initially played golf in her hometown, until the age of 16, being part of Brazilian team for the Youth South American team, in Uruguay 2000 competition. She then spent some time in the UK, before returning to Brazil in 2010. During her brief stay in UK, she approached Liam Cook and asked him to conduct few coaching sessions for her.

Her alternative sport was handball, as a goalkeeper for Poços de Caldas team until the age of 17. Moretti did not play cricket until the age of 27, when she was invited by her spouse to join the soft ball league, playing alongside the first participants from Confederação Brasileira de Cricket development program. She was inspired to pursue her interest in the sport of cricket due to her husband's involvement in cricket projects. She was part of Cricket Poços team on the first Brazilian Women's National league, in 2013 and subsequently selected as part of the Brazilian Women's National squad in 2014, making her debut in April 2014.

In addition, she also runs a fruit export business in Brazil. She currently holds a key position as an administrator at Cricket Brasil. She also teaches the sport to kids in different schools during her spare time and also regarded as a fitness fanatic as she trains at least four hours per day at the high-performance centre.

International career
In 2014, Moretti was selected to be part of the national women's cricket team in Brazil. She was the first cricketer for Brazil, male or female, to score a century in a Twenty20 match.

Moretti had her breakthrough in golf in 2017, after being top 5 on National Ranking and selected for the Brazilian team for the Copa Los Andes, in Bolívia, and Copa Srta. Fay Crocker, in Uruguay, in 2017.  She was also part of the Brazilian doubles on Taça Pee-Wee, played in São Fernando Golf Club, Cotia. Moretti retired from competitive golf in July 2018. 

In March 2017, Moretti was named captain of Brazil's squad ahead of the Iguassu Cup, a bilateral tour played against Argentina. As an allusion to her relatively mature age and leading status in Brazilian cricket, she has been nicknamed "Big Mom". She was also invited to be a part of the CanAm team on Philadelphia Cricket Festival, captained by Claire Taylor in that year. CanAm was the only women's team in the men's competition.

Moretti made her WT20I debut for Brazil on 23 August 2018, against Mexico, in the opening fixture of the 2018 South American Women's Cricket Championship. In the summer of 2019, she trained in the United Kingdom at Bexley Cricket Club. In October 2019, Brazil women won the 2019 South American Cricket Championship, with Moretti finishing as the leading run-scorer of the tournament with 116 runs in five matches.

In April 2021, during the COVID-19 pandemic, Moretti took to social media to discuss mental health issues during the pandemic. The following month, she was one of forty women selected to be mentored for the ICC 100% Cricket Future Leaders Programme.

References

Further reading

External links
 
 
 Noughtie Child Podcast: Season 8 Episode 1 (4 December 2021) – includes interview of Roberta Moretti Avery

1985 births
Living people
Sportspeople from Minas Gerais
Brazilian women cricketers
Brazil women Twenty20 International cricketers
Women cricket captains